Cem Uluğnuyan (born December 12, 1989) is a Turkish taekwondo practitioner competing in the bantamweight division. He transferred to Ankara PTT S.K. from İzmir Büyükşehir Belediye S.K.

Cem Uluğnuyan was a member of the Turkey national team, which became world champion at the 2009 World Cup Team Championships held in Baku, Azerbaijan. He won the bronze medal at the 2009 World Taekwondo Championships held in Copenhagen, Denmark. The same year, he became European champion at the U-21 European Championships held in Vigo, Spain. At the 2010 European Championships held in Saint Petersburg, Russia, he won the bronze medal in bantamweight division.

References

1989 births
Turkish male taekwondo practitioners
Living people
European Taekwondo Championships medalists
World Taekwondo Championships medalists
21st-century Turkish people